Bulbophyllum samoanum, also known as the Samoan bulbophyllum, is a species of orchid in the genus Bulbophyllum.

Description
Unifoliate epiphyte. Blooms on a single flowered 12 cm long inflorescence

Distribution
Bulbophyllum samoanum is native to Samoa, and also to Fiji, New Caledonia, and Vanuatu.

Occurrence
It grows in areas of partial shade and high temperatures

Uses
Bulbophyllum samoanum is cultivated as an ornamental plant.

References
The Bulbophyllum-Checklist
The Internet Orchid Species Photo Encyclopedia

samoanum
Orchids of Oceania
Orchids of New Caledonia
Flora of Fiji
Flora of Samoa
Flora of Vanuatu